Francis Szpiner (born 22 March 1954) is a French lawyer, writer and politician of The Republicans who serves as the mayor of the 16th arrondissement of Paris since 2020. He was an attorney for several prominent French politicians.

Education and early life 
He was born as the youngest of three siblings and the only son into a family with a Jewish-Polish background. His grandparents fled from the Nazis and his parents were printers. After he attended high school at the Lycée Jacques-Decour, he studied law and then joined, in the early 1970s, the Institute of Criminology in Paris of the Panthéon-Assas University.

Professional career 
Throughout his career as a lawyer he represented several prominent clients before court and was a legal counselor to Jacques Chirac, Madame Claude or Bernard Tapie. Szpiner represented Jean-Bédel Bokassa, the former Emperor of the Central African Republic during his trial for treason and murder in the Central African capital Bangui. In June 1987, Bokassa was sentenced to death for murder, but acquitted from charges on cannibalism. In 2003, during Abdullah Öcalans appeal at the European Court of Human Rights (ECHR) in Strasbourg, he was a lawyer representing the Turkish Government. The ECHR ruled that Öcalan did not have a fair trial and ordered Turkey to pay a remuneration. He represented the former French Prime Minister and then Mayor of Bordeaux Alain Juppé in a trial, in which Juppé was accused of providing fictitious jobs in the town hall of Paris. Juppé was sentenced to a suspended prison sentence and given 10 year political ban in January 2004. Then he was the attorney for the relatives of the murdered Jewish Moroccan Ilhan Halimi. Halimi was sequestrated and killed by members of the Gang of Barbarians. The prosecution alleged Halimi was murdered for being a Jew and Szpiner obtained a life sentence for the gang leader in 2006, but demanded higher sentences for his accomplices. He also represented the entrepreneur Hubert Haddad who had been accused of bribing the President of French Polynesia Gaston Flosse. Haddad and Flosse were both sentenced to five year imprisonment in October 2012. He represented the victims of Carlos the Jackal. For Carlos he obtained a life imprisonment. In 2013 he co-founded the Law Firm Stas & Associates In 2015 he represented Qatar who sued Florian Phillipot for repeatedly accusing Qatar of financing terrorism. He represented the Government of Senegal in a trial against the mayor of Dakar Khalifa Sall. The mayor of Dakar was sentenced to 5 years imprisonment for corruption charges in 2018 but pardoned by the Senegalese president Macky Sall in September 2019.

Political career 
In 1990, he was appointed chief of staff to Alexandre Léontieff, then president of the government of French Polynesia; in 2002, he ran against Arnaud Montebourg in the sixth district of Saône-et-Loire. In the municipal elections of 2020, he was elected as the mayor of the 16th arrondissement of Paris representing The Republicans.

Books 

 Fantôme de papier
 Mat d'echecs 
 Une affaire de femmes was adapted for screen by Claude Chabrol as A story of women. 
 Une affaire si facile

Recognition 

 April 2021 Lawyer of the month by Le Figaro.
2011 Legion of Honour
2000 Received the rank of an Officer of the French Order of Merit

References

1954 births
Living people
Mayors of arrondissements of Paris
Councillors of Paris
The Republicans (France) politicians
21st-century French lawyers
Paris 2 Panthéon-Assas University alumni
Commandeurs of the Légion d'honneur
Officers of the Ordre national du Mérite
French people of Polish-Jewish descent